Oligoria is a genus of butterflies in the family Hesperiidae.

References

External links
Natural History Museum Lepidoptera genus database

Hesperiini
Taxa named by Samuel Hubbard Scudder
Hesperiidae genera